The 2022 Tercera División RFEF play-offs to Segunda División RFEF from Tercera División RFEF (promotion play-offs) will be the final play-offs for the promotion from 2021–22 Tercera División RFEF to 2022–23 Segunda División RFEF.

Format
Group champions will be promoted directly to the Segunda RFEF. Due to the remodeling of the RFEF leagues, as of this season the promotion play-off is divided into two stages: regional and national. Four teams from each group participate in the regional stage, which were classified between places second and fifth of the regular season. The regional stage is a single match played on neutral ground. The second classified will face the fifth classified; and the third will do the same with the fourth. The winners of the two series will play a match to determine the team that will qualify for the national stage. 

In the regional phase, if a match ends in a draw, extra time will be played, if the same result is maintained at the end of extra time, the best seeded team will win.

The national stage will be played by 18 teams, which won their respective regional play-offs. Nine different matches will be played to determine the winners of the promotion to Segunda RFEF.

Qualified teams

Regional stage

Group 1 – Galicia
Playoffs were played at Estadio Verónica Boquete de San Lázaro, Santiago de Compostela (Semi–finals) and Estadio Anxo Carro, Lugo (Final)

Group Champion: Polvorín

Play-off winner: Ourense CF

Group 2 – Asturias
Playoffs were played at Estadio Ganzábal, La Felguera (Langreo)

Group Champion: Real Oviedo Vetusta

Play-off winner: Lealtad

Group 3 – Cantabria
Playoffs were played at Estadio Santa Ana, Tanos (Torrelavega)

Group Champion: Gimnástica de Torrelavega

Play-off winner: Escobedo

Group 4 – Basque Country
Playoffs were played at Lezama Facilities, Lezama; Estadio de Lasesarre, Barakaldo (Semi–finals) and Zubieta Facilities, San Sebastián (Final)

Group Champion: Deportivo Alavés B

Play-off winner: Beasain

Group 5 – Catalonia
Playoffs were played at Estadi Municipal de Can Roses, Rubí

Group Champion: Manresa

Play-off winner: Olot

Group 6 – Valencian Community
Playoffs were played at Estadio Guillermo Olagüe, Gandia

Group Champion: Valencia Mestalla

Play-off winner: Atlético Saguntino

Group 7 – Community of Madrid
Playoffs were played at Polideportivo Dehesa de Navalcarbón, Las Rozas

Group Champion: Atlético Madrid B

Play-off winner: Alcorcón B

Group 8 – Castile and León
Playoffs were played at Estadio La Arboleda, Almazán

Group Champion: Guijuelo

Play-off winner: Atlético Tordesillas

Group 9 – Eastern Andalusia
Playoffs were played at Estadio Francisco Muñoz Pérez, Estepona

Group Champion: Juventud Torremolinos

Play-off winner: Almería B

Group 10 – Western Andalusia
Playoffs were played at Estadio Francisco Muñoz Pérez, Estepona

Group Champion: Recreativo de Huelva

Play-off winner: Utrera

Group 11 – Balearic Islands
Playoffs were played at Estadi Son Bibiloni, Palma de Mallorca

Group Champion: Mallorca B

Play-off winner: Manacor

Group 12 – Canary Islands
Playoffs were played at Anexo Estadio Gran Canaria, Las Palmas

Group Champion: Atlético Paso

Play-off winner: Tenerife B

Group 13 – Region of Murcia
Playoffs were played at Estadio Francisco Artés Carrasco, Lorca

Group Champion: Yeclano

Play-off winner: Cartagena B

Group 14 – Extremadura
Playoffs were played at Estadio Francisco de la Hera, Almendralejo

Group Champion: Diocesano

Play-off winner: Llerenense

Group 15 – Navarre
Playoffs were played at Estadio de San Francisco, Tafalla

Group Champion: Cirbonero

Play-off winner: Txantrea

Group 16 – La Rioja
Playoffs were played at Estadio El Mazo, Haro

Group Champion: Arnedo

Play-off winner: Alfaro

Group 17 – Aragon
Playoffs were played at Estadio Papa Luna, Illueca

Group Champion: Deportivo Aragón

Play-off winner: Utebo

Group 18 – Castilla–La Mancha
Playoffs were played at Estadio Manuel Delgado Meco, Alcázar de San Juan (Semi–finals) and Estadio Municipal Paco Gálvez, Tomelloso (Final)

Group Champion: Guadalajara 

Play-off winner: Quintanar del Rey

National stage

Format
The eighteen qualifying teems will be drawn into nine single-leg neutral site matches to determine the final promotion spots. For the purposes of the draw, the qualifying teams will be placed into pots corresponding to their final regular-season position in their respective groups (i.e. second-place finishers will be placed in one pot, third-place finishers in another, and so on). Participants will then be drawn such as to pit the highest remaining teams against the lowest. When teams that achieved the same standings finish are drawn to face each other, the team drawn first will be designated the home team. 

In games ending in a draw at the end of regulation, an overtime period will be played. If the scores are still level at the end of the overtime period, the team that achieved a higher regular season finish will be crowned the winner (a penalty shootout will be held in matches between teams level on standings).

All matches will be played in Las Rozas, 20 km northwest of Madrid, at the main field of the La Ciudad del Fútbol and at the nearby Campo Municipal Dehesa de Navalcarbón.

Qualified teams

Bold indicates teams that were promoted

Matches

|}

Promoted teams
The 18 teams that were promoted through regular season groups are included.
The numbers of years after the last promotion are referred to the last participation of the club in Segunda División B, the division that was partially replaced by the Segunda División RFEF.

References

External links
Royal Spanish Football Federation website

Tercera Federación play-offs
Play-offs
5